This is an incomplete list of basilicas of the Roman Catholic Church in Germany. A basilica is a church with certain privileges conferred on it by the Pope. Currently there are some 76 basilicas in Germany.

List of basilicas

External links
List of basilicas in Germany from GCatholic.org

Basilicas
 
Germany